Funda Önal (born 28 December 1981 in Sheffield, England where she attended Silverdale School) is a British model and dancer. She has starred in a range of campaigns like Nike and Adidas as well as appearing in music videos for Calvin Harris, Tinie Tempah and Kid Cudi. Önal is also known for starring in the British reality TV programme Made in Chelsea and played a Beauxbatons student in the film adaptation of Harry Potter and the Goblet of Fire. She has also appeared as a dancer on the X-Factor UK 2010–2011, and played Supergirl and Wonder Babe in comic books for Superheroines.net 

In 2012 she was cast as Sister Josephine in the British indie crime thriller Two Days in the Smoke alongside Matt Di Angelo, Stephen Marcus and Alan Ford.

She's the lead lady in the 2016 feature film Dead And Awake, directed by Alexander Fodor, and starring Jason Wing .

She is of Turkish descent.

References

External links
 
 Funda Önal CV

1981 births
Living people
English female dancers
English female models
English people of Turkish descent
People educated at Silverdale School, Sheffield
Television personalities from South Yorkshire
Actresses from Sheffield
Made in Chelsea